Blue Bird Aviation is a charter airline based in Khartoum, Sudan. It operates fixed-wing charter services as well as VIP, corporate shuttle, ground handling and aircraft maintenance services. Its main base is Khartoum International Airport.

Fleet
As of June 2020, the Blue Bird Aviation fleet consists of the following aircraft:

References

External links 
Blue Bird Aviation

Airlines banned in the European Union
Airlines of Sudan
Airlines established in 1989
Companies based in Khartoum